Night Out may refer to:

Film and TV
Night Out (film), Australian film
"Night Out" (The Office), episode of The Office

Music
Night Out (album) by Ellen Foley
A Night Out, 1961 album by Machito
"Night Out", song by Paul McCartney from Red Rose Speedway
"The Night Out", song by Martin Solveig from his album Smash

See also
Boys Night Out (disambiguation)
Girls' Night Out (disambiguation)